Rajiv Gandhi Institute of Petroleum Technology (RGIPT), in Jais, Amethi (formerly in Raebareli), Uttar Pradesh, India, is a training and education institute focusing on STEM and petroleum industry. It was formally opened in July 2008.

It has been accorded the Institute of National Importance status and a governance structure similar to that available to  IITs & NITs etc. It admits undergraduate students from the rank list of students who have qualified for Joint Entrance Examination – Advanced (JEE Advanced) Examination.

History

 4 Jul 2007: The Union Cabinet approved the setting up of the Rajiv Gandhi Institute of Petroleum Technology at Jais in Amethi District of UP.
 29 Nov 2007: The Rajya Sabha passed the Rajiv Gandhi Institute of Petroleum Technology (RGIPT) Bill 2007.
 3 Dec 2007: The Lok Sabha passed the Rajiv Gandhi Institute of Petroleum Technology (RGIPT) Bill 2007.
 20 Feb 2008: Congress President and UPA Chairperson Sonia Gandhi lays foundation stone of Rajiv Gandhi Institute of Petroleum Technology at Jais.
 2008–2009: Start of academic session.
 2011: Former Prime Minister of India Manmohan Singh laid the foundations of the Rajiv Gandhi Institute of Petroleum Technology (Assam centre).
 2012: First BTech batch passes out.
 2013: Bangalore centre gets approved.
 2014: Veerappa Moily, former Minister of Petroleum and Natural Gas inaugurates Rajiv Gandhi Institute of Petroleum Technology at Kambali Pura Village, Hoskote Taluk, Bangalore District.
 2015: First Convocation was conducted with Minister of Petroleum and Natural Gas Dharmendra Pradhan and other high level dignitaries from Ministry of Petroleum and Natural Gas as Chief Guests.
2016: Institute is moved to the permanent campus at Jais.
 22 Oct 2016: Union ministers, Minister of Textiles Shrimati Smriti Irani, Minister of Petroleum and Natural Gas Shri Dharmendra Pradhan and Minister of Human Resource Development Shri Prakash Javadekar, inaugurated the permanent campus at Jais.
 May 2017: The institute increases the student intake for BTech program to 120 seats from 75 seats.
 13 May 2017: Chief Minister of Assam Sarbananda Sonowal and Minister of Petroleum and Natural Gas Shri Dharmendra Pradhan jointly launched the full swing construction work of second campus at Sivasagar, Assam.
 Dec 2017: Sivasagar campus starts academic sessions for diploma in petroleum and chemical streams.
 Sept 2018: Bangalore Campus starts academic sessions for 3 MTech courses in the fields of Renewable Energy, Power and Energy Systems Engineering and Energy Science and Technology.

Campus

Main campus
 The institute started functioning from a leased land from Feroze Gandhi Institute of Engineering and Technology at Rae Bareli as academic center and ITI Township as Residential center for almost 9 years. On 15 October 2016, the institute was moved to a 125-acre newly constructed permanent campus at Jais, Uttar Pradesh. The infrastructure is not completely finished, but is expected to complete in 5 years.
 The new campus is a state-of-the-art campus with air conditioned classrooms having projectors, high definition televisions, computers for the faculty, video conferencing equipment. LAN connectivity has been provided in each room including hostel, classrooms along with permanent WI-FI setup has been provided.

Jais, Amethi Campus
Started academic sessions in June 2008 at a temporary campus at Rae Bareli. On 15 October 2016, the institute moved from temporary campus to the permanent campus at Jais.
 This campus offers the BTech, MTech, PhD programs and other research related activities.
From 2020 onwards, The Institute began offering BTech Courses in Computer Science Engineering and Electronics Engineering.
In the year 2021, a new four year B.Tech. programme in Mathematics & Computing has been started at RGIPT with the goal of setting the stage for developing skills in mathematics and computer science.

Noida Campus
 This campus used to run MBA and related courses. On 15 October 2016, the institute moved from temporary campus to the permanent campus at Jais.

Assam Campus
 Started academic sessions in 2017 at Sivasagar, Assam in 37 acres as a first phase while 63 acres is under construction.
 On 13 May 2017, Chief Minister of Assam Sarbananda Sonowal and Minister of Petroleum and Natural Gas Shri Dharmendra Pradhan jointly launched the full swing construction work of second campus at Sivasagar, Assam.

Bangalore Campus
 Third campus of RGIPT, "Energy Institute, Bengaluru" is in Bengaluru.
 In July 2013, Karnataka government agreed to offer 150 acres of land to set up the Bangalore centre which is going to be Asia's first centre on fire and safety for oil and gas sector. Energy Institute, Bengaluru is currently offering 04 M.Tech. programmes namely M.Tech. in Renewable Energy, Energy Science and Technology, Power and Energy Systems Engineering & Electric Vehicle Technology and PhD programmes in all disciplines of Engineering specifically in the field of Energy. The institute has commenced its academical activities from its transit campus at NMIT Bangalore from 2018.
 This campus would initially house 10 research labs established over 1.8 lakh square feet in a research cum academic complex. An Energy Experience Centre, Incubation/E-Cell, Library, Auditorium and Seminar Halls etc. will support the activities of the campus. The institute coming up will cost .

Organisation and administration

Departments
RGIPT has the following departments:

 Department of Computer Science and Engineering
 Department of Electronics Engineering
 Department of Petroleum Engineering
 Department of Chemical Engineering
 Department of Management Studies
 Department of Geology
 Department of Chemistry
 Department of Physics
 Department of English
 Department of Mathematical Sciences
 Department of Electrical Engineering
 Department of Computer Science and Design Engineering
 Department of Information Technology
 Department of Renewable Energy Engineering

Future Departments
 Department of Instrumentation Engineering
 Department of Fire Engineering
 Department of Mechanical Engineering

Budget

Jais campus
The total estimated capital cost:   861 crores ( 416 crores (Central Exchequer) +  250 crores (GOI) +  150 crores (Oil Industry Development Board) +  45 crores (Institute itself))
The institute's permanent campus infrastructure was provided with  129 crores during Congress led UPA government and additional  302 crores were provided by the current NDA government for completion of campus.
During fiscal 2016–17, Ministry of Petroleum and Natural Gas has allocated additional  47 crores while the institute remains independent to generate more funds for operational purposes through college fees and other funds/awards.

Sivasagar campus

Bangalore campus
It one of the most expensive research institutes in India.

Academics

Admissions
 The institute admits BTech students from the rank list of qualified students in the JEE Advanced Examination and MTech through GATE.
 For MBA, institute admits candidates from qualification through CAT score.
 For admission to PhD programmes, candidates must have a valid scorecard of: GRE/NET (UGC/CSIR)/NBHM/ DBT/ GPAT/ Rajiv Gandhi National Fellowship/ Maulana Azad National Fellowship/ DST Inspire Award or any similar Fellowship.

Rankings

The National Institutional Ranking Framework (NIRF) ranked it 134 among engineering colleges in 2020.

Academic programmes

 RGIPT offers courses in engineering, pure sciences, management and humanities with a focus on petroleum engineering. The programs and courses offered at RGIPT are changing as the school evolving into a full-fledged petroleum engineering university.
 Admission to the courses of BTech is done from candidates appearing for JEE Advanced Examination.
 Admission to the MTech courses are done through the Graduate Aptitude Test in Engineering (GATE).
 Admissions to the MBA program is done through the Common Admission Test (CAT). Interviewing cities are Delhi, Mumbai, Bangalore, Kolkata, Lucknow and Jais.
 Admissions to the MSc.Tech. and PhD courses are done through examinations conducted by the institute at Jais.
 Entrance examination is held at Sivasagar campus for all diploma engineering courses.

Integrated Aerospace Development Program

RGIPT has collaborated with some pioneer institutes for advancements in aviation/aerospace and Rocket Fuels/Petroleum Technology.
 Indian Institute of Technology Kanpur through an MOU has decided to be the mentor of the program.
 Fundamentally, the Aerospace program is by IET Raebareli from APJ Abdul Kalam Technical University.
 Currently, the program is running in complete collaboration with Indira Gandhi Rashtriya Uran Akademi.
 MNNIT Allahabad and Indian Institute of Information Technology, Allahabad are providing academic assistance.
 In future, Indian Institute of Science, Bangalore is said to be in full-fledged resource (academic and managerial) collaboration with FGIET/ IET Raebareli.

Admission process depends on several factors including aptitude, intellect, personality and learning of the student. The selected students are a group who have qualified at-least one of the required admission tests like JEE-Mains/Advanced, WBJEE, SEE-AKTU and even SATs. The students have been provided residential services in-campus at Jais, Amethi. The educational program will require for transition in between college departments/campuses on an annual even-semester basis.

Student life

Energia

This is an annual festival of three days of activities including sporting events, talent playoffs and similar activities. It was separated from the annual cultural festival in 2017 and since then, sporting events are held in this festival. Sawai godara is the current Energy Chief and prime person behind sport activities in the college  In 2019, this event marked its third anniversary as sports were part of annual cultural fest since the beginning of the institute. This festival is currently financed by the institute while some of the amount is fetched by sponsorship.

Kaltarang

Kaltarang is the annual cultural and sports fest of Rajiv Gandhi Institute of Petroleum Technology, Amethi. It is a themed fest, generally held in the month of February every year, since the very first time in 2011. It is a three-day fest having events like rock band performance, fashion show, rock band competition, stand-up comedy, cyber gaming, themed events, various sports events.

See also
 List of autonomous higher education institutes in India

References

Universities and colleges in Amethi district
Engineering colleges in Uttar Pradesh
Amethi district
Petroleum engineering schools
Energy in Uttar Pradesh
Institutions of Petroleum in India
Educational institutions established in 2007
2007 establishments in Uttar Pradesh